Indian Mission School, also known as the Nanticoke Indian Center, is a historic school building located in Millsboro, Sussex County, Delaware. It was built in about 1948, after the original school was destroyed by fire.  It is a one-story, stuccoed masonry building with a gable roof.   It features a concrete block covered entrance.  The school was organized after school reforms of the early 20th century mandated that the children of the strongly Native American families of the Nanticoke be placed in the same schools as African-American students.

It was added to the National Register of Historic Places in 1979.

See also
Indian Mission Church

References

External links
Nanticoke Indian Center website

School buildings on the National Register of Historic Places in Delaware
Schools in Sussex County, Delaware
School buildings completed in 1948
Nanticoke tribe
Native American history of Delaware
National Register of Historic Places in Sussex County, Delaware
Millsboro, Delaware